Barroquinha is a community in the Brazilian state of Ceará. The population was estimated at 15,044 in 2020.

The municipality contains part of the  Delta do Parnaíba Environmental Protection Area, created in 1996.

References 

Municipalities in Ceará
Populated coastal places in Ceará